Chris Richmond (born July 29, 1986) is an American businessperson and entrepreneur. He founded a television streaming site called ShareTV.com, co-founded an adtech platform called Proper Media and acquired popular websites such as TV Tropes, Snopes and Salon.com.

Career 
Richmond founded his first large website in 2007, called ShareTV.com. This became one of the first online distribution partners of HULU and TheWB, and was one of first sites to stream the Oscars online.

In 2014, Richmond, along with his business partner Drew Schoentrup, acquired TV Tropes, a wiki geared toward fiction writers. To announce the purchase, Richmond and Schoentrup launched a Kickstarter campaign to ask the members for their help in improving the project. The campaign raised more than $100,000 in donations.

In 2015, Richmond co-founded an adtech platform called Proper Media. Its first official client was Snopes.com, the largest and oldest fact-checking website on the web. After a year, Proper Media purchased a significant stake in Snopes.com. There was a legal dispute regarding whether Proper Media purchased 50% or 40% of Snopes.com which started in 2017 and continued until 2022 when Richmond and Schoentrup bought out all other shareholders of Snopes.

In 2018, Richmond helped with his 3rd acquisition by acquiring Spoutable.com under Proper Media. This acquisition added eight employees and nearly doubled the reach of Proper Media.

In 2019, Richmond and his business partner completed the acquisition of Salon.com for $5 million from Salon Media Group.

In 2021, after 6 years of year over year growth with Richmond as CEO, Proper Media was sold to Sovrn Holdings. The terms of the acquisition were not disclosed.

In 2022, Richmond took over as CEO of Snopes after completing the transaction with Schoentrup to buy out the other shareholders.

Cybersquatting case 
Richmond started out at ShareTV.org and was completely unable to obtain the commercial equivalent, ShareTV.com, from a cybersquatter. In 2013, Richmond won a lawsuit for ShareTV.com against the cybersquatter, despite the fact that they owned the domain seven years before ShareTV began its trademark.

Snopes.com lawsuit 
As of 2016, Richmond was engaged in a lawsuit against Snopes over whether he and Drew Schoentrup own 50% or 40% of Snopes. As a result of this dispute, ad revenue was withheld from Snopes.com  and its founder David Mikkelson launched a GoFundMe campaign to keep Snopes.com running.

References 

21st-century American businesspeople
Internet-based activism
1986 births
Living people
Businesspeople from Oakland, California